Anton Oleksiyovych Shvachko (born 11 December 1992) is a Ukrainian politician currently serving as a People's Deputy of Ukraine from Servant of the People, serving as a People's Deputy from the party's list. He is also head of the regional secretariat of the Servant of the People party in Ukraine's northern Sumy Oblast.

Early life and career 
Anton Oleksiyovych Shvachko was born in 1992 in the city of Sumy, in northern Ukraine. After graduating from secondary school, he studied at Sumy National Agrarian University's faculty of food technology, graduating with a bachelor's degree. In 2017 he received a master's degree in "restaurant technological engineer" at the university's faculty of economics and management.

Political career 
Shvachko was an unsuccessful candidate for People's Deputy of Ukraine in the 2019 Ukrainian parliamentary election, as 139th on the party list. At the time of submitting documents as a candidate to the Central Election Commission in July 2019, he was an independent and unemployed, living in Sumy. In the summer of 2019, he participated in the training of People's Deputies in Truskavets.

Shvachko became a deputy after Denys Monastyrsky, who was a People's Deputy from Servant of the People, was appointed Minister of the Interior on 16 July 2021. On 7 September 2021, Shvachko was sworn in as a People's Deputy.

References 

1992 births
Living people
Politicians from Sumy
Servant of the People (political party) politicians
Ninth convocation members of the Verkhovna Rada